The Miss Nicaragua 2008 pageant was held on February 23, 2008 in Managua, after weeks of events. At the conclusion of the final night of competition, Thelma Rodríguez won the title of Miss Nicaragua Universe. She represented Nicaragua at Miss Universe 2008 held later in the year in Vietnam. The rest of the finalists would enter in different pageants.

Placements

Special awards

 Most Beautiful Face - Managua - Gwendolyne García Leets
 Miss Lubriderm Cream - Tipitapa - Blanca García
 Miss Photogenic - Leon - Nydia Blandino
 Miss Congeniality - Leon - Nydia Blandino
 Miss Elegance - Managua - Gwendolyne García Leets
 Best Hair - Managua - Gwendolyne García Leets
 Best Smile - Tipitapa - Blanca García

.

Official Contestants

Judges

 Olga Cozza de Picado - Owner of Teletica S.A.
 Dr. Alfonso Pares - Plastic Surgeon
 Marianela Lacayo - Miss Nicaragua 2002
 Jorge E. Valladares - Senior Programme Manager of International IDEA
 Isolda Hurtado - Nicaraguan Writer
 Desiree Garcia - Director of Film and Media Studies, Associate Professor at Arizona State University
 Luis Adolfo Perez - General Director of GRUPO 505
 Carlos Morales - Manager of CIM Nicaragua S.A
 Mayela Romero - Regional Manager of Distribuidora Radis,S.A

Background Music

Opening Show – La Nueva Compañia - "Polka Cumbia"

Swimsuit Competition - Rihanna - "Don't Stop The Music"

Evening Gown Competition – Gerardo Frisina - "Descarga"

.

References

Miss Nicaragua
2008 in Nicaragua
2008 beauty pageants